The 1990 African Cup of Nations was the 17th edition of the Africa Cup of Nations, the football championship of Africa (CAF). It was hosted by Algeria. Just like in 1988, the field of eight teams was split into two groups of four. Algeria won its first championship, beating Nigeria in the final 1–0.

Qualified teams 

The 8 qualified teams are:

  (hosts)
  (holders)

Venues 
The competition was played in two venues in Algiers and Annaba.

Match officials 
Referees
  Laurent Petcha (Cameroon)
  Mohamed Hussam El-Dine (Egypt)
  Jean-Fidèle Diramba (Gabon)
  Badou Jasseh (Gambia)
  Idrissa Traoré (Mali)
  Idrissa Sarr (Mauritania)
  Eganaden Cadressen (Mauritius)
  Abdellali Naciri (Morocco)
  Badara Sène (Senegal)
  Ally Hafidhi (Tanzania)
  Mawukpona Hounnake-Kouassi (Togo)
  Naji Jouini (Tunisia)

Invited referees 
  Shizuo Takada (Japan)
  Jamal Al Sharif (Syria)

Squads

Group stage

Group A

Group B

Knockout stage

Semi-finals

Third place match

Final

Statistics and awards

Player of the Tournament 
1  Rabah Madjer (76 pts)
2  Tahar Chérif El-Ouazzani
3  Djamel Menad
–  Rashidi Yekini
–  Webster Chikabala

CAF Team of the Tournament

Scorers 
4 goals
  Djamel Menad

3 goals

  Djamel Amani
  Rashidi Yekini

2 goals

  Rabah Madjer
  Chérif Oudjani
  Emmanuel Maboang
  Abdoulaye Traoré
  Webster Chikabala

1 goal

  Tahar Chérif El-Ouazzani
  Moussa Saïb
  Serge Maguy
  Adel Abdel Rahman
  Uche Okechukwu
  Emmanuel Okocha
  Mamadou Diallo
  Moussa N'Dao
  Linos Makwaza

Own goal
  Abdelhakim Serrar (against Senegal)

References

External links 

 Details at RSSSF

 
Africa Cup of Nations
Africa Cup of Nations tournaments
Nations
African Cup of Nations
African Cup of Nations